"Monster" is a song by Atlanta-based rapper 21 Savage from his second studio album I Am > I Was (2018). The song features actor and rapper Childish Gambino, and was produced by DJ Dahi, Axl Folie, Dave Sava6e, and Tiggi. The song was first previewed on December 16, 2018 on 21 Savage's Instagram and was eventually sent to rhythmic contemporary radio on May 7, 2019.

Composition and lyrics
The song is about how wealth and fame can turn a person into a "monster", as summarized in the chorus: "Power / The money and the fame make a monster." Childish Gambino also expresses his disillusionment in the music industry, rapping: "Me and Savage, we came from the dirt / If you rappin' for money, you silly / This shit ain't a milli', this shit is a hundred / The industry savage and most of you average".

Live performances
On August 3, 2019, 21 Savage performed the song at Lollapalooza with Childish Gambino.

Charts

Certifications

References

2019 singles
2019 songs
21 Savage songs
Songs written by 21 Savage
Donald Glover songs
Songs written by Donald Glover
Songs written by DJ Dahi
Song recordings produced by DJ Dahi